Wood-Ridge High School is a four-year comprehensive public high school that serves students in seventh through twelfth grade from Wood-Ridge, in Bergen County, New Jersey, United States, operating as the lone secondary school of the Wood-Ridge School District. The school was established in 1922.

As of the 2021–22 school year, the school had an enrollment of 570 students and 48.9 classroom teachers (on an FTE basis), for a student–teacher ratio of 11.7:1. There were 44 students (7.7% of enrollment) eligible for free lunch and 1 (0.2% of students) eligible for reduced-cost lunch.

Approximately 100 public school students from Moonachie attend Wood-Ridge High School, as part of a sending/receiving relationship with the Moonachie School District.

Awards, recognition and rankings
The school was the 232nd-ranked public high school in New Jersey out of 339 schools statewide in New Jersey Monthly magazine's September 2014 cover story on the state's "Top Public High Schools", using a new ranking methodology. The school had been ranked 176th in the state of 328 schools in 2012, after being ranked 137th in 2010 out of 322 schools listed. The magazine ranked the school 101st in 2008 out of 316 schools. The school was ranked 143rd in the magazine's September 2006 issue, which surveyed 316 schools across the state.

Athletics
The Wood-Ridge High School Blue Devils participate in the North Jersey Interscholastic Conference, which is comprised of small-enrollment schools in Bergen, Hudson County, Morris County and Passaic County counties, and was created following a reorganization of sports leagues in Northern New Jersey by the New Jersey State Interscholastic Athletic Association (NJSIAA). Prior to the NJSIAA's realignment that took effect in the fall of 2010, Wood-Ridge was a member of the Bergen County Scholastic League (BCSL). With 327 students in grades 10-12, the school was classified by the NJSIAA for the 2019–20 school year as Group I for most athletic competition purposes, which included schools with an enrollment of 75 to 476 students in that grade range. The school was classified by the NJSIAA as Group I North for football for 2022–2024.

Interscholastic programs available at the high school include:

Fall
Football
Volleyball
Cheerleading
Soccer (Boys & Girls)
Tennis (Girls)

Winter
Bowling (Boys & Girls)
Wrestling
Indoor track (Boys & Girls)
Competition Cheerleading
Basketball

Spring
Baseball
Softball
Track & Field (Boys & Girls)
Tennis (Boys)

Athletic accomplishments

Baseball 
NJC champions - 1960, 1966, 1972 (co-champions), 2016 (co-champions)
Bergen County Tournament champions - 1972
BCSL Olympic champions - 1981, 1987
Sectional champions (North I, Group I), 1960, 1961, 1965 and 1968.

Boys basketball 
State champions (North I Group I) - 1962, 1963, 1977, 1978, 2011, 2019
Group I state champions - 1979 (finishing 28-1 after a 74-58 tournament final win against Wildwood High School)
BCSL Olympic champions - 1977, 1978, 1979, 1980, 1981
BCSL National champions - 2003, 2006, 2008
NJIC Meadowlands champions - 2011
All Century Bergen County - Jimmy Hawthorne
All Decade (1970-1979) Bergen County - Fred Ketcho

Girls basketball 
BCSL Olympic champions - 1978, 1979

Bowling 
BCSL Olympic champions - 1991, 1992, 1993, 1995, 1996, 1997, 2010
BCSL National champions - 2005
BCCA Tournament champions - 1986, 1997

Cheerleading (competition) 
Spirit Unlimited National Champions - 2003
Cheer & Dance Extreme National Grand Champions - 2005
Americheer International Grand Champions - 2007, 2009, 2010, 2011, 2012, 2013, 2014, 2015
Quest For the Best Champions - 2007, 2008
NJCDCA All-Music State Champions - 2009, 2013, 2014, 2015

Cross country 
BCSL National champions - 1989

Football 
State champions (North I Group I) - 1949, 1970, 1977
Sectional champions - 1960, 1965
BCSL Olympic champions - 1972, 1977, 1986

Golf 
BCSL champions - 1976

Girls soccer 
BCSL National champions - 1998, 2001, 2002, 2003, 2004, 2005, 2006, 2007, 2008, 2009, 2010
State sectional champions (North I Group II) - 2008 (as joint team with Hasbrouck Heights High School)

Softball 
State champions (North I Group I) - 1976, 1977, 1983, 2010
BCSL Olympic champions - 1975, 1976, 1978, 1979, 1981
BCSL National champions - 2009

Boys tennis 
BCSL National champions - 2004, 2005, 2009

Girls tennis 
BCSL National champions - 2004, 2005, 2006, 2008 (Co-Champs), 2010

Boys track and field 
State sectional champions - 2007
BCSL National champions - 2008

Girls track and field 
BCSL National champions - 2004, 2005

Volleyball 
BCSL Olympic champions - 1989, 1991
BCSL National champions - 2007 (Co-Champs)
NJIC Meadowlands Division Champions - 2010, 2011, 2016, 2017, 2018, 2019
NJIC Conference Tournament Champions - 2018

Wrestling 
BCSL Olympic champions - 1976
BCSL National champions - 2003, 2004, 2005, 2007, 2008
District 5 champions - 1981
District 15 champions - 2002, 2004, 2006, 2007
State sectional (North II Group I) - 2006, 2007
Bergen County Tournament champions - 2007

NJSIAA Sportsmanship Award 
2000-01, 2007–08

Administration
The school's principal is Ben Suro. His core administration team includes the assistant principal and athletic director.

Notable alumni
 Alex Boniello (born 1990), actor best known for his portrayal of the Voice of Moritz in the 2015 Broadway revival of Spring Awakening.
 Leonard T. Connors (1929-2016), politician who served in the New Jersey Senate from 1982 to 2008 representing the 9th Legislative District and was the Mayor of Surf City, New Jersey from 1966 to 2015.
 Paul Sarlo (born 1968), construction industry executive and politician who has served in the New Jersey Senate since 2003, where he represents the 36th Legislative District.
 Jennifer Velez (born 1965 or 1966), former Commissioner of the New Jersey Department of Human Services.

References

External links 
Wood-Ridge High School
Wood-Ridge School District
Wood-Ridge High School Handbook

School Data for the Wood-Ridge School District, National Center for Education Statistics
Wood-Ridge Junior Football & Cheering
Wood-Ridge Junior Wrestling

1922 establishments in New Jersey
Educational institutions established in 1922
Moonachie, New Jersey
Public high schools in Bergen County, New Jersey
Wood-Ridge, New Jersey